Langø (or Langøya) is a 0.55 km2 (55 ha, 136 acres) island which lies outside Skravestad in the Tønsbergfjord of Sandefjord, Norway. The island was part of Stokke municipality with the exception of a minor cape that belonged to Sandefjord. The island became part of Sandefjord municipality when Stokke merged into Sandefjord in 2016. The island is accessible through a bridge that connects to the road Sandsveien. The island was named for its long shape. Langø has previously been a part of Sandeherred and Stokke municipalities. Prior to Stokke’s merge into Sandefjord, a small part, Skravestadholmen, was part of Sandefjord. Langø is a 1.5 km long island that is 550 decares (0.55 km2). It consists of farm fields, small mountains, hills, and forests. Five burial mounds from the Bronze Age have been discovered on the island. Throughout most of the 1600s, the island belonged to residents of Tønsberg. In the 1660s, it was purchased and managed from Skravestad in Stokke.

It is a car-free island consisting of meadows, knolls, salt meadows, small bays, and forests. It became a landscape conservation area in 2006. It is known for its wide variety of rare wildflowers including species such as sea thrift, alternate-leaved golden-saxifrage, cowslip, greater yellow-rattle, sticky catchfly, and many others.

References

Sandefjord
Stokke
Islands of Vestfold og Telemark
Nature reserves in Norway